The United States of America will compete at the 2013 World Championships in Athletics from August 10 to August 18 in Moscow, Russia.  The membership of the team was selected at the 2013 USA Outdoor Track and Field Championships.  However, membership on the team was subject to the athlete achieving a qualification standard.  In addition, champions from the previous World Championships and the 2012 IAAF Diamond League receive an automatic bye.  An automatic entry is also available to an Area Champion, the IAAF definition of an Area essentially being the specified continental areas of the world.   The United States is part of the North American, Central American and Caribbean Athletic Association, which has not held a championship apparently since its inaugural championship in 2007.  The deadline for entries was July 20.  The final team membership as submitted to the IAAF was announced on July 29, 2013.

Medallists
The following American competitors won medals at the Championships

Team selection

The team was led by reigning World Champions Jason Richardson
(110m hurdles), Christian Taylor (triple jump), Dwight Phillips (long jump),
Jesse Williams (high jump), and Trey Hardee (decathlon) on the
men's team, and Carmelita Jeter (100m), Jennifer Simpson (1500m), Lashinda Demus (400m hurdles), and
Brittney Reese (long jump) on the women's team.

2012 Diamond League champions Charonda Williams (200m), Dawn Harper (100m hurdles), Chaunte Lowe (high jump) and Reese Hoffa (shot put) were also automatic qualifiers to the team.  World record holder Aries Merritt was also a Diamond League champion in 2012, but a country is only allowed one bye into the championships.  The bye into the 110m hurdles was already taken by Jason Richardson, so Merritt had to qualify by placing in the championships.

Team members

Men

Decathlon

Women

Heptathlon

See also
United States at other World Championships in 2013
 United States at the 2013 UCI Road World Championships
 United States at the 2013 World Aquatics Championships

References

External links
 Official local organising committee website
 Official IAAF competition website

Nations at the 2013 World Championships in Athletics
World Championships in Athletics
2013